Wang Haijiang (born July 1963) is a general (Shangjiang) of the People's Liberation Army (PLA), currently serving as commander of Western Theater Command since August 2021. He previously served as commander of Xinjiang Military District, and commander of Tibet Military District from 2016 to 2018.

Biography
Wang was born in Anyue County, Sichuan in July 1963. Wang participated in the Sino-Vietnamese War and won first class merit. After war, he became secretary of Li Qianyuan,  former commander of Lanzhou Military Region. He served in the 76th Group Army since 1997. In January 2013 he was promoted to become deputy commander of Nanjiang Military District, a position he held until 2016, when he was appointed deputy commander of Tibet Military District. In December 2019, he rose to become commander there. In March 2021, he was transferred to northwest China's Xinjiang and appointed commander of Xinjiang Military District, he remained in that position until August 2021, when he was elevated to commander of Western Theater Command.

On December 10, 2019, he was awarded the military rank of lieutenant general (zhongjiang) by Central Military Commission chairman Xi Jinping. On 6 September 2021, he was awarded the military rank of general (shangjiang) by chairman Xi Jinping.

He was a delegate to the 13th National People's Congress.

References

1963 births
People from Anyue County
Living people
People's Liberation Army generals from Sichuan
Delegates to the 13th National People's Congress